The Stony River (Deg Xinag: Gidighuyghatno' Giqedhatno; Dena'ina: K'qizaghetnu) is a  tributary of the Kuskokwim River in the U.S. state of Alaska. The river flows south from near Mount Mausolus in the Revelation Mountains of the Alaska Range through the northwestern corner of Lake Clark National Park and Preserve. From there, it flows generally westward to meet the larger river at the community of Stony River.

Boating
The Stony River, navigable by kayak, canoe, and small to medium raft, is "suitable for moderately experienced boaters with good wilderness skills." The river varies in difficulty from Class I (easy) to II (medium) on the International Scale of River Difficulty.

See also
List of Alaska rivers

References

Rivers of Bethel Census Area, Alaska
Rivers of Alaska
Rivers of Unorganized Borough, Alaska